Bathys Limen, meaning deep harbor, was a town located on the coast of the Propontis on the promontory of Cyzicus, in ancient Mysia.

Its site is located near Vathy, Asiatic Turkey.

References

Populated places in ancient Mysia
Former populated places in Turkey